Naoshi Kanno (13 October 1921 – 1 August 1945) was a Japanese fighter ace in World War II. He is credited with 25 confirmed kills.

Life and career

Born on October 13, 1921, as the second son of a police chief, in Ryuguchi (now near Pyongyang, North Korea). He grew up in Edano Village, Igu County, Miyagi Prefecture (present-day Kakuda City), and his parents were also from this neighborhood. He loved his eldest brother, Iwao, who was an honor student, and did not quarrel with his brothers. In place of his strict mother, he adored his older sister Kahoru, who was seven years older than him, and he sometimes slept with her until the first year of junior high school (under the old system of junior high school). Although he was obedient to his brother and sister, he was a cheerful and quarreling general outside and had a bullish side toward fighting enemies when his brother was bullied. When he was seven or eight years old, he wrestled with a local dog and killed it with a knife. However, such a bully, Kanno, continued studying until late at night and always had the top grade in the class, so people around him wondered when and where that bully was studying.

He entered Kakuda Junior High School with the best grades. The junior students at that time said, "We did something weird and we couldn't imagine it." We couldn't lose if we had a fight, and maybe we weren't very good at morals or behavior, but the popularity was huge." In addition, a classmate said, "Kanno was rather a nampa" (literary boy)." Kanno was a literary boy in junior high school who was devoted to Takuboku Ishikawa, liked tanka, and formed a literary circle with his classmates. The tanka of Kanno posted in the literary section of the Kahoku Shimpo at that time was selected. When he was in the 4th year of junior high school, he was studying for university entrance exams, but for financial reasons, he said, "Your brother should go to college. I will be a soldier."

Kanno enrolled in the Japanese Navy Academy in December 1938, graduating in February 1943 in the 70th class. He gained the reputation as a rebellious but skillful fighter pilot. Initially based in Micronesia, his unit fought many engagements over the Philippines and the Yap island. On 27 October 1944 he claimed to have shot down 12 Grumman F6F fighter planes. He made requests to transfer to a kamikaze unit, but those were denied as he was considered too valuable a pilot to sacrifice. In December 1944 he became the squadron commander of the 301st Squadron of the 343rd Air Group. His unit moved back to the Kyushu in the Japanese home islands toward the end of the war.

Disappearance and aftermath
His final mission took place on 1 August 1945, two weeks before the end of the war, when he took off to intercept a group of B-24 bombers escorted by P-51 Mustang fighters off the island of Yakushima south of Kyushu. He sustained damage when a barrel of his gun exploded, and went missing in action shortly afterwards, presumed dead. His remains were never found. He was posthumously promoted two ranks to Commander in the following month.

In fiction
Kanno is one of the protagonists of the Drifters manga and anime, where he was voiced by Tatsuhisa Suzuki.

See also
List of people who disappeared mysteriously at sea

References

External links

1921 births
1940s missing person cases
1945 deaths
Aerial disappearances of military personnel in action
Japanese military personnel killed in World War II
Japanese naval aviators
Japanese World War II flying aces
Missing in action of World War II
Missing person cases in Japan
People from Miyagi Prefecture
People lost at sea